is a railway station on the Shinetsu Main Line in the city of Jōetsu, Niigata, Japan, operated by the East Japan Railway Company (JR East).

Lines
Dosokohama Station is served by the Shin'etsu Main Line, and is 9.4 kilometers from the terminus of the line at Naoetsu Station.

Station layout
The station consists of two opposed side platforms, with no direct connection between them. Passengers wishing to change platforms must leave the station and walk to the nearest road crossing. The station is unattended.

Platforms

History
The station opened on 15 March 1960. With the privatization of Japanese National Railways (JNR) on 1 April 1987, the station came under the control of JR East.

Surrounding area
former Ogata town hall
 Ogata Middle School

See also
 List of railway stations in Japan

External links

 JR East station information 

Railway stations in Niigata Prefecture
Railway stations in Japan opened in 1960
Stations of East Japan Railway Company
Shin'etsu Main Line
Jōetsu, Niigata